Title 32 of the United States Code outlines the role of the United States National Guard in the United States Code. It is one of two ways the National Guard can be activated by the US Federal Government.  Under Title 32, National Guard remains under control of the state.

 —Organization
 —Personnel
 —Training
 —Service, Supply, And Procurement
 —Homeland Defense Activities

External links
U.S. Code Title 32, via United States Government Printing Office
U.S. Code Title 32, via Cornell University

32
Title 32
National Guard (United States)